The 2003 Karbala bombings consisted of four suicide attacks on the coalition military barracks in Karbala, Iraq,  south of Baghdad on December 27, 2003.

The attackers targeted two coalition bases and a downtown Iraqi police station where U.S. military police were stationed. All of the attacks occurred within a 20-minute span.

The attacks
Bulgarian guards at the perimeter of their forward base at the University of Karbala shot the suicide bomber as the gasoline tanker bore down on the front entrance. The Bulgarian Army chief of staff, Nikola Kolev, said that they expected attacks because Karbala had been suspiciously peaceful.

In the attack on the Thai Humanitarian Assistance Task Force 976 Thai-Iraq camp the bomber killed two Thai soldiers and wounded five others when he rammed his vehicle into the walls. The Thais were confident enough about their security that they planned to send 200 Thai civilians to visit their troops.

In the double attack on the police station seven Iraqi policemen and five civilians were killed. Five American soldiers were among the wounded.

See also 
 2004 Karbala and Najaf bombings
 5 January 2006 Iraq bombings
 2007 Karbala bombings
 2008 Karbala bombing
 24 January 2011 Iraq bombings
 2011 Karbala bombing

References

External links 
Bulgarian soldiers refuse duty in Iraq after deadly attack
Karbala attacks kill 12, wound dozens
Police station and 2 bases hit in southern city
13 killed, 172 wounded in coordinated attacks in Iraq

2003 murders in Iraq
Explosions in 2003
21st-century mass murder in Iraq
Military history of Bulgaria
Military history of Thailand
Mass murder in 2003
Suicide car and truck bombings in Iraq
Terrorist incidents in Iraq in 2003
Karbala
Attacks on military installations in the 2000s
December 2003 events in Asia
Building bombings in Iraq